The premiership of Lal Bahadur Shastri extended from 9 June 1964 to 11 January 1966. Formerly the Minister of External Affairs, Shastri became the Indian Prime Minister after the death of Jawaharlal Nehru, India's first Prime Minister, on 27 May 1964. Shastri's tenure as Prime Minister lasted only nineteen months due to his sudden death in Tashkent (then Soviet Union).

Taking office
After the death of Nehru, several leaders of the ruling Indian National Congress nominated Shastri due to his socialist background, to stand against the conservative Morarji Desai. With the backing of Congress President Kumaraswami Kamaraj, Shastri became the party's choice for Prime Minister. Shastri was sworn in on 9 June 1964 taking over from the Acting Prime Minister Gulzarilal Nanda. Commanding a strong majority in the Indian Parliament that it had won in the 1962 Indian general election Shastri and the Congress party did not call fresh elections. In his first broadcast as Prime Minister, Shastri said:

Council of Ministers
Shastri retained many members of Nehru's Council of Ministers. T. T. Krishnamachari was retained as the Finance Minister of India, as was Defence Minister Yashwantrao Chavan. He appointed Swaran Singh to succeed him as External Affairs Minister. He also appointed Indira Gandhi, daughter of Jawaharlal Nehru and former Congress President, as the Minister of Information and Broadcasting. Gulzarilal Nanda continued as the Minister of Home Affairs.

In a President's Daily Brief submitted by the U.S. Intelligence Community to the then President Lyndon B. Johnson on 10 June 1964, it was quoted that
The Cabinet Shastri has put together clearly reflects his tendency to keep to the middle of the political road. Both the extreme right and left has been frozen out.

Domestic affairs
Shastri continued Nehru's socialist economic policies with central planning. He promoted the White Revolution – a national campaign to increase the production and supply of milk – by supporting the Amul milk co-operative of Anand, Gujarat and creating the National Dairy Development Board. While speaking on the chronic food shortages across the country, Shastri urged people to voluntarily give up one meal so that the saved food could be distributed to the affected populace.

Security and foreign affairs
Shastri also continued Nehru's policy of non-alignment but also built closer relations with the Soviet Union. In the aftermath of the disastrous Sino-Indian War of 1962 and the formation of military ties between the Chinese People's Republic and Pakistan, Shastri's government considerably expanded the defence budget and strengthened India's armed forces.

War with Pakistan

Laying claim to half the Kutch peninsula, the Pakistani army skirmished with Indian forces in August, 1965. In his report to the Lok Sabha on the confrontation in Kutch, Shastri stated:

Shastri accepted British mediation, but received much criticism at home for agreeing to the British Prime Minister's scheme to grant Pakistan 10%, instead of the original claim of 50% of the territory. But when Pakistani forces began incursions into the Indian state of Jammu and Kashmir, Shastri ordered Indian forces to cross the international boundary to repel Pakistani forces. Massive tank battles occurred in the Punjab, and while Pakistani forces made some gains, Indian forces captured the key post at Haji Pir, in Kashmir, and brought the Pakistani city of Lahore under artillery and mortar fire.

Tashkent Declaration
Shastri and Pakistan's Ayub Khan agreed to a cease-fire mandated by the United Nations. Shastri won great popularity for taking a firm stand against Pakistani aggression. In a broadcast to the nation on the day of the ceasefire, Shastri stated:

Shastri accepted mediation from the Soviet Union and signed the Tashkent Declaration on 10 January 1966 with Pakistani president Ayub Khan in the presence of Alexei Kosygin, the Premier of the Soviet Union. Both nations agreed to withdraw their forces to pre-war lines, normalise diplomatic relations and use dialogue to resolve disputes.

Death and succession
Prime Minister Shastri died in Tashkent the day after signing the Tashkent Declaration. He was eulogised as a national hero and the Vijay Ghat memorial established in his memory. Upon his death, Gulzarilal Nanda once again assumed the role of Acting Prime Minister until the Congress Parliamentary Party elected Indira Gandhi over Morarji Desai to succeed Shastri.

See also
 Premiership of Indira Gandhi

References

1960s in India
 
Shastri, Lal Bahadur